Time for Living was a Canadian variety television series which aired on CBC Television in 1969.

Premise
This variety series included music and comedy that was intended for young adults. Host Ray St. Germain was joined by the comedy troupe The Society (originally called The Just Society). Show writer Alan Thicke was a member of The Society. Guests included musicians Lenny Breau and Beverly Glenn-Copeland, and comic Rosemary Radcliffe. Rick Wilkins was the show's musical director.

Scheduling
This half-hour series was broadcast Thursdays at 8:30 p.m. (Eastern) from 11 September until its final episode on 11 December 1969.

References

External links
 
 

CBC Television original programming
1969 Canadian television series debuts
1969 Canadian television series endings